Alter/Ego  (アルター・エゴ) is a free real-time vocal synthesizer software which was created by Plogue.

About
Alter/Ego is a text-to-speech synthesizer which aims to create more modern vocals, working to post 1990s research. It was offered as a free plug-in and is used for music making to produce singing vocals.  It operates in a similar manner to Chipspeech.  Vocals are clean-cut though robotic sounding and the software is ideal for vocal experimentation. It is capable of running different speech engines.

There are currently only 2 released vocals for the software. The released vocals are purchased separately.  The vocals come as files that need to be extracted as they lack installers.  Over time Plogue have received many vocal requests from individuals since the release of the software, however they are limited by their small development team and being busy.

In January 2016 it was announced that there were 6 new vocals in production.  No more vocals are due after Leora and Marie Orks final two vocal updates.  Plogue have since moved on to other adaptations of the engine. One such adaptation is the ability for the engine to detect Microsoft text-to-speech voices and load them into the engine.  UTAU has also been experimented with.  Plogue noted that the engine was designed to have user made vocal support from the beginning, though this was yet to be implemented due to a lack of support for this.

In 2017 the production of new voicebanks ceased with Marie Ork "Clear" and Leora having been confirmed the last voicebanks being produced for the software.  The cease of new voicebanks came in the wake of a scandal with the creator of voicebanks "Vera" and "Nata". Though the engine has been updated since 2017, since it is identical to the Chipspeech engine, the overall development of Alter/ego has ceased.

Characters
Daisy: Daisy was the very first vocal added to the software.  Daisy is a lonely time traveler and the estranged lover of Chipspeech vocal, Dandy 704. Daisy was offered as a free separate download, allowing her to be imported into both Alter/Ego and Chipspeech and acted as the default vocal.  She was retired and replaced with Bones.
Tera Eleki (エレキテラ); was revealed on Sept 7th 2015 and was a Japanese only vocal.  She has since been cancelled.
ALYS: A female vocal released on March 10, 2016.  She sings in French and Japanese, and has a Live Polyphonic CAhoir mode. She was developed by VoxWave. On December 15th, 2021, the news that VoxWave had closed, and that ALYS for AlterEgo was now free, and ALYS' previously unreleased UTAU prototypes were now free and open source, was released on Phundrak, ALYS' creator's blog.
Bones: A male vocal that sings/talks in English and sings in Japanese, first unveiled in Jan 2016, first released in Oct 31 2016.  He replaced Daisy as the default vocal for the software.  He has a Chinese vocal being currently worked on.
Marie Ork: a Death Metal female vocalist, she was released on 1 December 2016 and sings in English.  She was released with two vocals "Growl" and "Space". A "Talk" and "Clean" vocal were later added.
LEORA: The second French female vocal developed by VoxWave. She was created complementary to ALYS, with English and French voicebanks.
NATA: An English vocal developed by Vocallective. She is an adult female and was released on January 11, 2017.  Though she started out as official, Plogue has since dropped their support of her.
VERA: Was a female English prototype developed by Azureflux from Vocallective without the Plogue's authorization, the project was available on this page, but is now cancelled.

Reception
As noted by BPB, Alter/Ego is praised for being a powerful tool by standards of free software.  It, however, has a steep learning curve, though highlighted how easy it was to get the synthesizer to sing lyrics, calling the product "fun" to work with overall.  Later in December that year, the software was awarded second place in their top 50 free instruments list.

Computer Music magazine also covered the synthesizer in their December 2015 issue.

References

External links

Speech synthesis software
Singing software synthesizers